Stéphane Hoffmann (6 March 1958, Saint-Nazaire) is a French writer.

Biography 
Stéphane Hoffmann was sent to the Jesuits at Saint-François-Xavier in Vannes for ten years, then to the Frères de Ploërmel at the Lycée Saint-Louis in Saint-Nazaire.

After he studied in hypokhâgne at lycée Janson-de-Sailly in Paris, and although admitted in khâgne, he preferred to continue history and law studies in 1977 at the Paris-Sorbonne University and the Panthéon-Assas University. He finished them with a bachelor's degree in history (1980) and a master's degree in private law, obtained in 1983 in Nantes, where he lived from 1980 to 1992.

After three days working as a chronicler in the radios of Nantes, he organized "Les mardis nantais" between 1983 and 1987, evenings where he would receive some writers, including Félicien Marceau, Bernard-Henri Lévy, Jean d'Ormesson, Régine Deforges, Hélène Carrère d'Encausse, and Geneviève Dormann.

The publication of his first novel in 1989 opened him the doors of Le Figaro Magazine, where he published his first article on the history of the sandwich in 1990. He wrote a few hundred more on books, actresses, cigars and the best way to polish one's shoes.

Since March 2013, he holds a television critic's column: "La vision télé de Stéphane Hoffmann".

At La Baule-Escoublac, he has organized and animated since 2003 "Les Rendez-Vous de La Baule", where he invites every year twenty authors to meet their readers. And, since 2011, "Les Rendez-Vous des écrivains", the first weekend of December.

Works 
1989: Le gouverneur distrait, novel – Albin Michel
1990: Château Bougon, novel – Albin Michel, 1990 – Prix Roger Nimier 1991
1991: Voyage à l'Ouest - dix étapes en Loire-Atlantique. Conceived and presented by Stéphane Hoffmann, with texts by Patrick Besson, Michel Déon, Geneviève Dormann, Irène Frain, Luba Jurgenson, Félicien Marceau, Éric Neuhoff, François Nourissier, Didier van Cauwelaert and Armel de Wismes - Albin Michel
1994: Félicien Marceau, essay – Éditions du Rocher
1995: Gaillot l’Imposteur, leaflet – Éditions du Rocher
1996: Le Bon Tabac, traité sur les bienfaits du tabac – Albin Michel
1997: La Droite honteuse, tableau des mœurs politiques françaises à la fin du 20e siècle – Éditions du Rocher
1998: Le Grand Charles, or En écoutant Trenet chanter, portrait discographique de Charles Trenet – Albin Michel
2000: Journal d’un crétin, novel – Éditions du Rocher – Prix Louis Barthou of the Académie française
2001: La Gloire des cachalots, pamphlet contre les notables – Éditions du Rocher
2002: Le Gros Nul, selfportrait – Éditions du Rocher
2007: Des filles qui dansent, novel – Albin Michel – Prix Bretagne 2008
2008: Des garçons qui tremblent, novel – Albin Michel - Prix Ève Delacroix (Académie française) and Grand Prix d'honneur of la ville de La Baule (Société littéraire et artistique de La Baule)
2011: Les Autos tamponneuses, novel - Albin Michel, - first selection Prix de Flore  2011 - finalist Prix Interallié 2011 - finalist Prix des Deux Magots 2012
2014: Le Méchant prince et autres histoires sans morales, short stories - Albin Michel
2016: Un enfant plein d'angoisse et très sage, novel - Albin Michel - Prix Jean-Freustié 2016 - first selection Renaudot - first selection Grand Prix du roman de l'Académie française - first selection Interallié  - selection Prix Renaudot young adult - finalist Grand prix Jean Giono - selection prix des Deux Magots 2017.

External links 
 Nantes. Stéphane Hoffmann en piste pour le Renaudot et le Giono on Ouest France
 Le Prix Jean Freustié 2016 attribué à Stéphane Hoffmann on Booquin
 Le Prix Jean-Freustié 2016 pour Stéphane Hoffmann on LivresHebdo
 Destinées sentimentales on Le Figaro
 Stéphan Hoffmann on the site of the Académie française
 Un enfant plein d'angoisse et très sage - Stéphane Hoffmann on YouTube

20th-century French essayists
21st-century French essayists
20th-century French journalists
21st-century French journalists
20th-century French novelists
21st-century French novelists
Roger Nimier Prize winners
Prix Jean Freustié winners
1958 births
People from Saint-Nazaire
Living people
Lycée Janson-de-Sailly alumni